Ribeira de Pena is a municipality in the Vila Real District, in Norte Region in Portugal. The population in 2011 was 6,544, in an area of 217.46 km2.

Located on a zone of transition between the harsh and mountainous Trás-os-Montes and the verdant Minho, the municipality of Ribeira de Pena, crossed by the calm waters of the Tâmega River, displays unique characteristics and also offers visitors the unmistakable flavour of the region's "green wine." Equally rich is the heritage left by man since remote times, visible at abundant prehistoric remains such as the Stone Age engravings of Lamelas, several dolmens and archaeological monuments and fortified settlements such as the ruins found at Monte do Cabriz, near the village of Cerva.

The current mayor is João Noronha, elected in 2017 by PS. The municipal holiday is August 16.

Notable people 
 Flávio Meireles (born 1976) a retired defensive midfield footballer with 327 club caps.

Parishes

Administratively, the municipality is divided into 5 civil parishes (freguesias):
 Alvadia
 Canedo
 Cerva e Limões
 Ribeira de Pena (Salvador) e Santo Aleixo de Além-Tâmega
 Santa Marinha

References

External links
 
 Photos from Ribeira de Pena

 
Municipalities of Vila Real District